Ruohonen is a Finnish surname. Notable people with the surname include:

Ilkka Ruohonen (1958–2016), Finnish cultural anthropologist and documentary filmmaker
Laura Ruohonen (born 1960), Finnish playwright and theatre director
Rich Ruohonen (born 1971), American curler
Seppo Ruohonen (1946-2020), Finnish opera singer
Matti ja Teppo Ruohonen, Finnish pop singer duo

See also
Pirkko Ruohonen-Lerner (born 1957), Finnish politician

Finnish-language surnames